Joseph Steinberg (April 22, 1883 – November 27, 1932) was an American lawyer and politician from New York.

Early life
He was born on April 22, 1883, in Manasquan, New Jersey. He attended Manasquan High School. He graduated from the College of the City of New York and the New York University School of Law. He practiced law in Manhattan.

Politics 
In November 1913, Steinberg ran on the Progressive ticket for the New York State Assembly (New York Co., 26th D.), but Democrat Abraham Greenberg was declared elected by a small margin. Steinberg contested Greenberg's election, and was seated on March 27, the day before the regular session adjourned sine die, in the 137th New York State Legislature. In November 1914, Steinberg was re-elected on the Progressive and Republican tickets, and was a member of the 138th New York State Legislature in 1915. In November 1915, Steinberg ran for re-election, but was defeated by Democrat Meyer Levy. Levy polled 2,885 votes; Steinberg polled 2,673 votes, and August Claessens polled 1,207.

Steinberg was a Republican member of the State Assembly (New York Co., 15th D.) in 1919, 1920, 1921, 1922, 1923 and 1924; and was Chairman of the Committee on Claims in 1921 and 1922. In 1921, he got engaged to Rhoda Weinstein.

Death 
He died on November 27, 1932.

References

1883 births
1932 deaths
People from Manhattan
Republican Party members of the New York State Assembly
New York (state) Progressives (1912)
20th-century American politicians
New York University School of Law alumni